Zygaena afghana is a species of moth in the Zygaenidae family. It is found in Afghanistan.

Subspecies
Zygaena afghana afghana
Zygaena afghana panjaoica Reiss & Schulte, 1964

References

Moths described in 1860
Zygaena
Moths of Asia